The National DNA Data Bank of Canada (NDDB) is a national DNA Database that was set up in 2000. Managed by the RCMP, it provide matches to convicted offenders and offer a memory repository for cold cases. The database hold 642,758 DNA profiles as of December 31, 2022.

History 
The first DNA analysis in Canada for investigative purposes was in April of 1989. The RCMP utilized the method to aid in the investigation of a sexual assault in Ottawa, Ontario. The suspect in the case denied allegations made by the victim. Subsequent use of DNA forensic analysis confirmed the suspect to be the perpetrator.

In 1995, Bill C-104 was unanimously passed by the parliament. This enabled provincial court judges to issue police warrants for obtaining biological samples from suspects in a criminal investigation.

In 1998, the DNA Identification Act was enacted by the parliament. The Act established a new law governing the creation and administration of a national DNA database. It updated the Criminal Code to allow a judge to authorize collection of bodily substances from a person found guilty of designated offences. Same year, after the Swissair Flight 111 disaster, a special DNA typing task force led by the RCMP used the technology to help identify human remains.

In 2000, National DNA Data Bank was officially launched. The legislation enabled this time, allowed military judges to make post-conviction DNA data bank orders.

National Missing Persons DNA Program 
National Missing Persons DNA Program (NMPDP) is an initiative established by the Royal Canadian Mounted Police in 2018 to support missing persons and unidentified remains investigations.

References

External links 
 National DNA Data Bank
 National Missing Persons DNA Program

Biometrics
DNA
Law enforcement in Canada
National DNA databases
Forensic databases
Biological databases